Xanthagaricus caeruleus is a species of the fungal family Agaricaceae. This species is described from China.

References

Fungi of China
Agaricaceae